The New River Formation is a geologic formation in West Virginia. It preserves fossils dating back to the Carboniferous period.

References
 

Carboniferous West Virginia